Schizura ipomoeae, the morning-glory prominent moth or false unicorn caterpillar, is a moth of the family Notodontidae. The species was first described by Edward Doubleday in 1841. It is found in the United States and southern Canada.

The wingspan is 36–47 mm. The forewings are highly variable in colour but usually greyish brown with a pattern of black streaks and spots. The hindwings are dirty white in males and dark grey in females. Adults are on wing from April to September in the south and from June to August in the north. There is one generation per year in the north.

The larvae feed on the leaves of various woody plants, including Fagus, Betula, Ulmus, Acer, Ipomoea, Quercus, Hamamelis, and Rosa species. Larvae can be found from May to October. The species overwinters in the pupal stage.

Taxonomy
There are a number of described forms.

Gallery

References

Moths described in 1841
Notodontidae
Moths of North America